TVP Historia is a Polish free-to-air television channel that was launched in May 2007. It focuses on history programming.

References

Histoire TV
Viasat History
History Channel
Rai Storia
Discovery History

External links

TVP Historia at LyngSat Address

Telewizja Polska
Television channels and stations established in 2007
Television channels in Poland